Chaetodontoplus septentrionalis, the blue-striped angelfish and bluelined angelfish, is a species of marine ray-finned fish, a marine angelfish belonging to the family Pomacanthidae. it is found in the Western Pacific Ocean.

Description
Chaetodontoplus septentrionalis has a background body colour of yellow to tan overlain with vivid longitudinal blue stripes and a yellow caudal fin. In the females the blue stripes run the length of the body. In the males the lines on the body are duller and they have blue lines on the face. 
 The juveniles have a black background colour and there are yellow markings on their fins and a yellow bar to the rear of the head.

Distribution
Chaetodontoplus septentrionalis occurs in the western Pacific Ocean from southern Japan and South Korea and Taiwan rot southern China.

Habitat and biology
Chaetodontoplus septentrionalis is commonest on rocky reefs which have large boulders and stones, as well as rubble slopes. Small juveniles are frequently commoner at depths over  down to  they are found on rocky, patch reefs and frequently stay close to a crevice where they can shelter if required. It feeds on sponges and tunicates. Like all other angelfish it is a protogynous hermaphrodite, with all individuals being female initially and the dominant ones changing to males.

Systematics
Chaetodontoplus septentrionalis was first formally described in 1844 by Coenraad Jacob Temminck and Hermann Schlegel with the type locality given as Nagasaki. The specific name means northern, thought to be a reference to its more northerly distribution than apparently related species.

Utlisation
Chaetondontoplus septentrionalis is infrequently traded in the aquarium trade but when it does appear it often thrives in captivity.

References

septentrionalis
Fish described in 1844